Liberty Property Trust was a real estate investment trust that invested in office buildings and industrial properties. As of December 31, 2017, the company owned interests in 461 industrial and 48 office properties comprising 86.0 million square feet.

History
The company traces its history to Rouse & Associates, which was formed in 1972 by Willard Rouse, George Congdon, David Hammers, and Menard Doswell to develop warehouse space in southern New Jersey.

In 1974, Rouse & Associates purchased the Great Valley Corporate Center (GVCC) in Malvern, Pennsylvania. This property was the first office park to incorporate a graduate college, a business development and training center, and a day care center.

In 1987, Rouse & Associates opened One Liberty Place, the first skyscraper in Philadelphia to be taller than Philadelphia City Hall, and the tallest building in Pennsylvania from 1987 to 2007. Elsewhere their UK subsidiary Rouse Kent developed Kings Hill in the United Kingdom.

In 1994, Rouse & Associates changed its name to Liberty Property Trust and became a public company via an initial public offering.

In 1995, the company acquired Lingerfelt Development Corporation in a $125 million transaction.

In 1997, the company acquired 2 portfolios of properties for $130 million.

In 2003, founder and chief executive officer Willard Rouse died from lung cancer.

The company owns a 20% interest in the project.

In 2016, the company sold a portfolio of 8 properties for $131.1 million, an 8 building portfolio in Herndon, Virginia for $97 million, and a portfolio of 108 properties for $969 million.

On February 4, 2020, the company was acquired by Prologis.

References

External links

1972 establishments in Pennsylvania
1994 initial public offerings
2020 mergers and acquisitions
2020 disestablishments in Pennsylvania
American companies established in 1972
Real estate companies established in 1972
Companies formerly listed on the New York Stock Exchange
Financial services companies established in 1972
Real estate investment trusts of the United States
Companies based in Chester County, Pennsylvania
Real estate companies disestablished in 2020
Financial services companies disestablished in 2020